The following is an incomplete list of Christmas songs which have appeared in the official singles chart in the United Kingdom. A year indicates the first year of release for that artist's recorded version of the single or track, which may not necessarily be the first year the artist's version charted on The Official UK Charts.To be regarded as a Christmas hit, the song either makes direct mention of Christmas, the winter season or the nativity, is a recognised Christmas hymn or carol. or has gone on to feature in Christmas compilation albums.

See also

 Best-selling Christmas/holiday singles in the United States
 Christmas music
 List of Christmas carols
 List of Christmas hit singles in the United States
 List of Christmas number one singles (UK)
 UK Singles Chart

References

Holiday songs lists
 
Christmas in the United Kingdom
British music-related lists
UK